Geoffrey Hughes may refer to:

Geoff Hughes (born 1939), Australian tennis player
Geoffrey Hughes (actor) (1944–2012), English actor
Geoffrey Forrest Hughes (1895–1951), Australian aviator and pilot

See also
Jeff Hughes (disambiguation), multiple people
Jeffrey W. Hughes (born 1966), American naval admiral